Human error is the primary cause or contributing factor in disasters and accidents.

Human Error may also refer to:

 Human Error (musician) (born 1982), Polish electronic musician 
 Human Error (album), a 1987 album by Unseen Terror
 "Human Error" (Star Trek: Voyager), a 2001 episode of Star Trek: Voyager
 "Human Error" (House), a 2007 episode of the TV series House
 Human Error (film), a 2004 film
"Human Error" (song), a song by Oh Land 
 "Human Error", a 2008 single by The Datsuns
 "Human Error", a song by Droideka
 "Human Error", a two-part episode of Transformers: Animated'''s third and "final" season
 Human error assessment and reduction technique, a technique used in the field of human reliability
 Human Error (punk rock band), a Swedish punk rock band
 Human Error'', a 1985 novel by Paul Preuss